Lebia histrionica is a species of beetle in the family Carabidae. The species is known from U.S. state of Arizona as well as Mexico and Guatemala.

References

Further reading

 
 

Lebia
Beetles described in 1883
Taxa named by Henry Walter Bates